Grassholm ( or ) or Grassholm Island is a small uninhabited island situated  off the southwestern Pembrokeshire coast in Wales, lying west of Skomer, in the community of Marloes and St Brides. It is the westernmost point in Wales other than the isolated rocks on which the Smalls Lighthouse stands. Grassholm is known for its huge colony of northern gannets; the island has been owned since 1947 by the Royal Society for the Protection of Birds, and is one of its oldest reserves. It reaches .

Grassholm National Nature Reserve is the third most important site for gannets in the world, after two sites in Scotland: St Kilda and Bass Rock. It serves as a breeding site for 39,000 pairs of the birds, and supports around 10 percent of the world population. The turbulent sea around Grassholm is a good feeding area for porpoises and bottlenose dolphins.

The island has a significant problem with marine plastic, brought to the island by breeding gannets, as nesting material which the birds have mistaken for seaweed floating in the surrounding waters. The problem has been ongoing through twelve years of RSPB conservation to 2017, and surveys have indicated that 80% of nests contain waste plastics.

Boats sail to Grassholm from St Davids Lifeboat Station and Martin's Haven on the mainland, but members of the public are not permitted to land.

Geologically, the island is largely formed from keratophyre, though the northwest coast and the islet of West Tump are formed from basalt. A couple of NE-SW aligned faults cross the island. Raised beaches are present in places.

The entertaining of the noble head

Grassholm has been identified with Gwales, an island in the medieval Welsh story  (Branwen the daughter of Llŷr), one of the Four Branches of the Mabinogi. Gwales is the site of a fabulous castle where the severed head of Brân the Blessed is kept miraculously alive for eighty years while his companions feast in blissful forgetfulness, until the opening of a forbidden door that faces Cornwall recalls them to their sorrow and the need to bury the head at the White Mount (the Tower of London). Brân is the Welsh for 'raven', which has a legendary connection with the Tower of London.

Shipwreck

On 15 July 1945, the cargo ship  ran aground on Grassholm and sank. Nine crew were rescued by the Angle Lifeboat.

See also
Brân the Blessed
Branwen
The Private Life of the Gannets

References

External links 

RSPB website
RSPB boat to Grassholm and Ramsey Island
 Large scale map

Islands of Pembrokeshire
National nature reserves in Wales
Nature Conservation Review sites
Royal Society for the Protection of Birds reserves in Wales
Special Protection Areas in Wales
Uninhabited islands of Wales